Tauno Timoska (5 April 1932 – 15 June 2022) was a Finnish field hockey player. He competed in the men's tournament at the 1952 Summer Olympics.

References

External links
 

1932 births
2022 deaths
Finnish male field hockey players
Olympic field hockey players of Finland
Field hockey players at the 1952 Summer Olympics
Sportspeople from Turku